Thailand competed at the 2012 Summer Paralympics in London, United Kingdom from August 29 to September 9, 2012.

Archery

|-
|align=left|Sakon Inkaew
|align=left|Men's ind. recurve standing
|602
|12
| (21)W 6-0
| (5)L 1-7
|colspan=4|did not advance
|-
|align=left|Wasana Khuthawisap
|align=left|Women's ind. recurve standing
|522
|9
|
| (8)L 4-6
|colspan=4|did not advance
|}

Athletics

Men's track

T11-13

T51-58

Men's field

Women's field

Boccia

Individual

Pairs and Teams

Powerlifting

Shooting

Swimming

Men

Wheelchair fencing

Women

Note: Ranks from qualification pools were given as an overall ranking against all other competitors.

Wheelchair tennis

See also
 Thailand at the 2012 Summer Olympics

References

Nations at the 2012 Summer Paralympics
2012
2012 in Thai sport